Patricia Wallace Ingraham is founding dean of the College of Community and Public Affairs at Binghamton University and a former Distinguished Professor of Public Administration at the Maxwell School, Syracuse University.

Education
She received her B.A. from Macalester College, an M.A. from Michigan State University, and her Ph.D. from Binghamton University.

Awards
In 2001, she received ASPA's Dwight Waldo Award.  In 2004, she received the American Political Science Association's John Gaus Award.

Publications

In 1990 Ingraham was elected as a fellow of the National Academy of Public Administration.
Government Performance: Why Management Matters, with Philip Joyce and Amy Kneedler Donahue (Baltimore: The Johns Hopkins University Press, in press).
Transforming Government: Lessons from the Federal Reinvention Laboratories, co-edited with James Thompson and Ronald Sanders (San Francisco: Jossey-Boss, 1997).
Civil Service Reform: Building a Government That Works with Donald Kettl, Ronald Sanders, and Constance Horner (Washington, DC: The Brookings Institution, 1996).
The Foundation of Merit (Baltimore: The Johns Hopkins University Press, 1995).
New Paradigms for Government: Issues for the Changing Public Service co-edited with Barbara Romzek (San Francisco: Jossey-Bass, 1994).
Readings in Contemporary Administration co-edited with David Rosenbloom (New York: McGraw Hill, 1994).
The Promise and Paradox of Civil Service Reform co-edited with David Rosenbloom (Pittsburgh: University of Pittsburgh Press, 1992).
An Agenda For Excellence: The American Public Service co-edited with Donald Kettl (Chatham, NJ: Chatham House, 1992).
Legislating Bureaucratic Change: The Civil Service Reform Act of 1978, co-edited with Carolyn Ban, (Albany: SUNY Press, 1984).
Building Government's Capacity to Perform: The Role of Management, Johns Hopkins
Review of Public Personnel Administration, The Journal of Public Human Resource Management
Ingraham, Patricia W., Yilin Hou, and Donald Moynihan. "Capacity, Management, and Performance: Exploring the Links." August, 2001. Paper presented at the American Political Science Conference, San Francisco, CA, August 30-September 2, 2001.
Kneedler, Amy, and Patricia W. Ingraham. "Dissecting the Black Box Revisited: A Refined Model of Government Management Performance and the Application of Criteria-based Assessment." April, 1999. Paper presented at the Workshop on Models and Methods for Empirical Study of Governance and Public Management, Tucson, AZ, April 29 – May 1, 1999.
Kneedler, Amy, and Patricia W. Ingraham. "Dissecting the Black Box: Toward a Model and Measures of Government Management Performance." October, 1997. Paper presented at the 4th National Public Management Research Conference, Athens, GA, October 30 –November 1, 1997.
Selden, Sally Coleman, Patricia W. Ingraham, and Willow Jacobson. "Human Resource Practices in State Governments: Findings from a National Survey." April, 1999. Paper presented at the 60th National Conference of the American Society for Public Administration, Orlando, FL, 10–14 April 1999.
Selden, Sally Coleman, Amy Kneedler, and Patricia W. Ingraham. "Measuring Government Management Capacity: A Comparative Analysis of City Human Resources Management Systems." December, 1999. Paper presented at the 5th National Public Management Conference, College Station, TX, December 1999.
Kneedler, Amy, Sally Coleman Selden, and Patricia W. Ingraham. "Measuring Government Management Performance: A Comparative Analysis of Human Resources Management Systems." December, 1999. Presented at the 5th National Public Management Research Conference, College Station, TX, 3–4 December 1999.

References

Binghamton University alumni
Syracuse University faculty
Michigan State University alumni
Living people
Year of birth missing (living people)
American women academics
Macalester College alumni
Binghamton University faculty
21st-century American women